"Romeo's Tune" is a song recorded by Steve Forbert, released in 1979 as the lead single from his album Jackrabbit Slim.

The song became an international hit during the winter of 1980. "Romeo's Tune" did best in Canada, where it became a top 10 hit.  It was Forbert's only major charting single.

Lyrical content
The song speaks of fading away from the world in the company of your lover. The title does not appear in the lyrics.

Instrumentation
The distinctive piano lick on "Romeo's Tune" was done by former Elvis Presley pianist Bobby Ogdin, a well-known Nashville session piano player. In live performances, Forbert plays the lick on a neck-mounted harmonica.

Use in media
"Romeo's Tune" is featured on the soundtrack of the 2001 movie, Knockaround Guys and the 2016 movie, Everybody Wants Some!!.

Chart history

Weekly charts

Year-end charts

See also
 List of 1970s one-hit wonders in the United States

References

External links
 "Romeo's Tune" at SongFacts
 

1979 songs
1979 singles
Steve Forbert songs